Alexander Dunlop Lindsay, 1st Baron Lindsay of Birker  (14 May 1879 - 18 March 1952), known as Sandie Lindsay, was a Scottish academic and peer.

Early life
He was born in Glasgow on 14 May 1879, the son of Anna and Thomas Martin Lindsay. Lindsay was educated from 1887 at the Glasgow Academy, then at the University of Glasgow, where he gained a Master of Arts degree in 1899, and lastly at University College, Oxford, where he took a Double First in 1902.

Career
In 1903 he won the Shaw fellowship in moral philosophy at the University of Edinburgh, as had his father, the first recipient of this award. He was assistant lecturer in philosophy at the Victoria University of Manchester from 1904 to 1906, when he was elected a fellow and tutor in philosophy at Balliol College, Oxford.

During the First World War he served in France, was mentioned twice in dispatches, and was a Lieutenant-colonel.

He was Professor of Moral Philosophy at the University of Glasgow (1922–24). He was president of the Aristotelian Society from 1924 to 1925. In 1924 he became master of Balliol College and became Vice-Chancellor of the University of Oxford from 1935 to 1938. He worked with Lord Nuffield who donated £1 million to fund a new physical chemistry laboratory and a postgraduate college for social studies, Nuffield College, Oxford in 1937.

At Oxford, Lindsay was a leading figure in the adult education movement. On his retirement from Balliol, in 1949, Lindsay was appointed the first Principal of the University College of North Staffordshire which opened in 1949 and is now Keele University.

In 1938, Lindsay stood for Parliament in the Oxford by-election as an 'Independent Progressive' on the single issue of opposition to the Munich Agreement, with support from the Labour and Liberal parties as well as from many Conservatives including the future Prime Ministers Winston Churchill, Harold Macmillan and Edward Heath, but lost to the official Conservative candidate, Quintin Hogg.

In 1949 Lindsay became the Founding Principal of the University College of North Staffordshire, which opened at Keele Hall in 1950. This unique institution - the first UK University of the 20th Century - tested many of Lindsay's educational principles and reflected the postwar idealism of its day. Known by many as the "Keele Experiment", many of the features of the New Universities of the 1960s were tested at Keele. The University College became the University of Keele in 1962.

Personal life
Lindsay married Erica Violet Storr (1877 - 28 May 1962), daughter of Francis Storr, in 1907 and they had one daughter and two sons.

He was elevated to the peerage on 13 November 1945 as Baron Lindsay of Birker, of Low Ground in the County of Cumberland. He was succeeded in the barony by his eldest son Michael Francis Morris Lindsay.

Selected bibliography
Socratic Discourses with an Introduction by A. D. Lindsay (1910)
Berkeley's A New Theory of Vision and Other Select Philosophical Writings with an Introduction by A. D. Lindsay (1910)
The Philosophy of Bergson (1911)
Five Dialogues of Plato, bearing on Poetic Inspiration  with an Introduction by A. D. Lindsay (1913)
Mill's Utilitarianism, Liberty & Representative Government with an Introduction by A. D. Lindsay (1914)
The Republic of Plato translated by A. D. Lindsay (1923)
Karl Marx's Capital an introductory essay (1925) 
Kant, Ernest Benn Limited / Oxford University Press, 1934. 1970 edition, Folcroft Press. ASIN: B0006C6R8G
The Two Moralities (1940)

References

External links
Drusilla Scott, A.D. Lindsay : a biography, Oxford : Blackwell, 1971, pp. 437, with chapters by Tom Lindsay and Dorothy Emmet.
Alexander Dunlop Lindsay
 
 

1879 births
1952 deaths
People educated at the Glasgow Academy
Academics of Keele University
Fellows of Balliol College, Oxford
Alumni of University College, Oxford
Academics of the University of Edinburgh
Academics of the University of Glasgow
Alumni of the University of Glasgow
Academics from Glasgow
Commanders of the Order of the British Empire
Scottish socialists
Scottish philosophers
Kantian philosophers
Presidents of the Aristotelian Society
20th-century Scottish people
Masters of Balliol College, Oxford
Presidents of the Oxford Union
Barons created by George VI
British Army officers